Mongolia has three major mountain ranges. The highest is the Altai Mountains, which stretch across the western and the southwestern regions of the country on a northwest-to-southeast axis. The Khangai Mountains, mountains also trending northwest to southeast, occupy much of central and north-central Mongolia. These are older, lower, and more eroded mountains, with many forests and alpine pastures. The Khentii Mountains near the Russian border to the northeast of Ulaanbaatar, are lower still.

Thirteen mountains are capped with a glacier in Mongolia.

The following is a list of mountains in Mongolia:

See also
 Geography of Mongolia
 List of Mongolia-related topics

Mongolia
Mongolia
Mongolia